Roger C. Wilson (April 25, 1912 – October 11, 1988) was a composer of church music active from about 1940 until about 1975.  His works were frequently included in Lorenz Publishing's serials during this era, and many were subsequently anthologized.

Some of his compositions were attributed pseudonymously to either Benton Price, Walter Price, Stewart Landon, Lee Rogers, Harold West, or Thomas Ahrens.

References
 1972 U.S. copyright renewals, U.S. Copyright Office
 Biography of Roger C. Wilson

American male composers
1912 births
1988 deaths
20th-century American composers
20th-century American male musicians